Kanagapuram or Kanakapuram is a town in Kilinochchi District, Sri Lanka. Famous Kaala Vairavar Temple is situated in Kangapuram.

References

Towns in Kilinochchi District
Karachchi DS Division